In English football, the Goal of the Season is an annual competition and award given on BBC's Match of the Day, in honour of the most spectacular goal scored that season. It is typically contested between the winners of the preceding ten Goals of the Month, although the goal can and has come from any game in the regular season, including international qualifiers and friendlies—potentially from the opening league games of the season to the end of the European season UEFA Champions League final. In several instances, the goal has come in the final game of the domestic season, the FA Cup Final, the most recent example of which is Steven Gerrard's last minute goal in 2006. However, in 1980–81, for example, the superb goal scored by Ricky Villa in the FA Cup Final replay for Tottenham Hotspur against Manchester City could not be considered as voting had already taken place.

In general, the winning goal has occurred for an English side within the domestic English league or cups, although there are no particular rules; Kenny Dalglish's goal in 1982–83 for Scotland being an exception. The goal usually comes from competitions to which the BBC holds television rights and which are shown under the Match of the Day banner; at present Premier League highlights and FA Cup live matches and highlights, although some have come from the equivalent Sportscene broadcast by BBC Scotland. Due to the lack of BBC European club football coverage, held predominantly by ITV, Sky and BT Sport, no goal of the season has ever been scored in European club competition despite many contenders.

Due to a transfer of broadcast rights, the entries for the 2001–02, 2002–03 and 2003–04 seasons were decided on ITV's The Premiership, which have been subsequently recognised by the BBC. When the BBC previously could not show league footage from 1988–89 to 1991–92, the winning goal in each season was scored in the FA Cup which they held the rights to. League rights holder ITV had its own competition during these seasons for Goal of the Season, broadcast on the Saint and Greavsie show. Previously the channels had shared league and cup rights (showing different matches to each other) and for many years ITV broadcast its own Golden Goals competition as an equivalent of Goal of the Season. From 2013–14 season onwards, the Goal of the Season has been chosen by a Twitter poll and the BBC Sport website. Jack Wilshere is the first player to win Goal of the Season in consecutive seasons (2013–14 and 2014–15) since the start of the Premier League. and is only the second player overall to have achieved this after John Aldridge, who won the award in both 1987–88 and 1988–89 (which pre-dated the Premier League era) seasons. The 1987–88 competition was unique in that all 10 goals shortlisted were scored by Liverpool players. As of 2018–19, this is the only occasion where the contenders were made up entirely of goals scored by players for one club.

For several years in the late 2000s, the winner was not subject to public vote due to the 2007 phone-in scandals. The winning goal was instead decided by pundits in the studio.

List of winners
Source

2014–15 Goal of the Season controversy
On 24 May 2015, the final day of the 2014–15 season, Match of the Day held an online vote at around 11 pm GMT for the Goal of the Season award. Users were able to vote via the BBC website or Twitter. The poll was quickly skewed by Arsenal supporters, many from the Far East, resulting in Jack Wilshere winning the award for his final day strike against West Bromwich Albion, despite not being the favourite. Host Gary Lineker expressed surprise as he read out the winner, and pundit Alan Shearer suggested that Charlie Adam should have won the award for his 66-yard effort against Chelsea, while fellow pundit Danny Murphy felt former Fulham teammate Bobby Zamora should have won.

The incident was labelled a "shambles" by Pete Smith of The Stoke Sentinel who also thought Stoke's Adam should have won, and a "concerted campaign by Arsenal fans" by Alan Pattullo of The Scotsman, who also felt the Scottish midfielder was deserving of the award. Mark Brus, of Caught Offside, also criticized the choice arguing that a goal in a meaningless game should not have won Goal of the Season and that Juan Mata's acrobatic effort against Liverpool was worthy of the award.

The following season, before the final episode of that season's Match of the Day, the programme's producers changed the rules to prevent a similar situation. The Goal of the Season award has since been decided by the pundits on the show, who will choose the winner based on the top three goals voted for by the public.

See also 
 BBC Goal of the Month
 Premier League Goal of the Season

References

English Football League on television
BBC
Football mass media in the United Kingdom
Premier League on television
Association football goal of the year awards